Kelami was a village in the Goranboy Rayon of Azerbaijan.

References
 

Populated places in Goranboy District